Reduan bin Haji Petara (born 25 May 1988) is a Bruneian international footballer who plays for Kasuka FC and the Brunei national team as a defender.

Club career
Reduan started playing club football with the youth team of March United. He transferred to AM Gunners of the Brunei Premier League in 2009, his defensive displays helped his club to finish third. After AM Gunners disbanded, he joined Indera SC and won the newly-formed Brunei Super League twice in a row.

Reduan signed with Brunei's professional club DPMM FC at the start of the 2015 S.League season. He only appeared twice in his debut season as DPMM won the S.League championship for the first time.

After 14 appearances in four seasons for the side, Reduan was released by DPMM in the 2018 close season. He joined Kasuka FC since then and scored a hat-trick in a 5-0 win over Lun Bawang FC on 24 February.

In 2022, Reduan went all the way with Kasuka to the final of the 2022 Brunei FA Cup where they were beaten 2–1 by his former club DPMM FC on 4 December.

International career
Reduan played in three editions of the Hassanal Bolkiah Trophy for the Brunei under-21s. His first tournament was in 2007 where he started in all three of Brunei's games. His second was in 2012 when the hosts won the trophy for the first time, though he was overlooked in the final match for Hazwan Hamzah. He returned as one of the five permitted overage players for the 2014 edition for an unsuccessful defence of the trophy. He played for the under-23s at the 2011 SEA Games, scoring the winner against Philippines in the group stage.

Reduan's full international debut for the Wasps came on 26 September 2012 in a friendly against Indonesia. He made further appearances at the 2014 AFF Suzuki Cup qualifying round and the 2018 World Cup qualifying first round for AFC.

Reduan was included in the squad for the 2018 AFF Suzuki Cup qualification match against Timor-Leste on 1 September 2018, but did not see any playing time. He was replaced by Hanif Hamir before the second leg at Bandar Seri Begawan.

Honours

Team
Indera SC
Brunei Super League: 2012–13, 2014
DPMM FC
 S.League: 2015

International
Brunei national under-21 football team
Hassanal Bolkiah Trophy: 2012

Individual
 
  Meritorius Service Medal (PJK) (2012)

References

External links

 

1988 births
Living people
Association football defenders
Bruneian footballers
Brunei international footballers
DPMM FC players
Indera SC players
Competitors at the 2011 Southeast Asian Games
Southeast Asian Games competitors for Brunei